Helper station is a railroad station in Helper, Utah. It is served by Amtrak's California Zephyr, which runs once daily between Chicago, Illinois, and Emeryville, California, in the San Francisco Bay Area. The station is owned by the Union Pacific Railroad and contains a passenger waiting area only; there are no services provided (e.g., ticketing, restrooms, lounge, etc.).

History
The station was originally built by the Denver and Rio Grande Western Railroad in 1881, and the current station building was constructed in 1940.

Beginning in 1983, both the Desert Wind (with service from Chicago to Los Angeles) and the Pioneer (with service from Chicago to Seattle) previously stopped at the Helper station. Service by the Pioneer was dropped when that train was rerouted through Wyoming in 1991 (the train was later discontinued altogether in 1997). Service by the Desert Wind ended when Amtrak discontinued that train in 1997 (at the same time as the Pioneer was discontinued). Also in 1997, the Green River station replaced the former station in Thompson Springs as the next station to the east.

Notes

References

External links

 Helper Amtrak Station (USA RailGuide -- TrainWeb)

Amtrak stations in Utah
Former Denver and Rio Grande Western Railroad stations
Buildings and structures in Carbon County, Utah
Transportation in Carbon County, Utah
Railway stations in the United States opened in 1881